Sir William Tudball (15 March 1866 – 21 April 1939) was Puisne Judge of the High Court of Judicature, Allahabad, India (1909–1922).

Biography

Tudball was born on 15 March 1866, the son of Charles Tudball of Bombay.  He was educated in England at Bedford Modern School.

Tudball joined the Indian Civil Service in 1885 and obtained an ICS Scholarship to Christ Church, Oxford in 1887.  He was a District and Sessions judge before rising to the rank of Puisne Judge of the High Court of Judicature, Allahabad, India (1909-1922).  He was knighted in 1921.

During World War I, Tudball held the rank of Lieutenant-Colonel commanding the 8th Allahabad Rifles of the Indian Defence Force (1916–18).

Tudball married Katie Sheen in 1889 and they had one daughter.  He died on 21 April 1939.

References

1866 births
Alumni of Christ Church, Oxford
People educated at Bedford Modern School
1943 deaths
British India judges
Knights Bachelor
Judges of the Allahabad High Court